Haldalsnuten  is a mountain in the municipality of Ål in Buskerud, Norway.

References

Ål
Mountains of Viken